Gymnosoma brevicorne is a Nearctic species of fly in the family Tachinidae.

References

Phasiinae
Diptera of Asia
Insects described in 1929
Taxa named by Joseph Villeneuve de Janti